Admiral Sir Percy Lockhart Harnam Noble, GBE, KCB, CVO (16 January 1880 – 25 July 1955) was a Royal Navy officer who served in both World Wars.

Noble rose to the rank of admiral and was Commander-in-Chief, Western Approaches for two crucial years during the Second World War, before being posted to the United States as Head of the RN Admiralty Delegation.

Naval career
The son of an Indian Army officer, Colonel Charles Noble and Anne née Hay, he was educated at Edinburgh Academy, before being commissioned in the Royal Navy on 15 January 1894.

Promoted as lieutenant on 1 April 1902, Noble was posted to the battleship HMS Hannibal serving in the Channel Fleet. He served in the Grand Fleet during the First World War. From 1918 to 1925 he commanded the cruisers HMS Calliope and HMS Calcutta and then the battleship HMS Barham before being appointed Senior Naval Officer, Harwich in 1925. He then commanded HMS St Vincent based at Forton, Gosport from 1927. He was appointed Director of Operations Division at the Admiralty in 1928. He was then Director of Naval Equipment from 1931 before returning to sea in command of the 2nd Cruiser Squadron in 1932. He then returned to the Admiralty as Fourth Sea Lord in 1935, before returning as Commander-in-Chief, China Station in 1938.

On his return to London, Admiral Noble was appointed Commander-in-Chief, Western Approaches, headquartered at Derby House, Liverpool, from February 1941 to November 1942. His work in reorganising escort groups, and revamping escort training methods are widely regarded as having been crucial foundational elements of the eventual success of the Allied navies in the Atlantic theatre. Noble was remembered by those who worked with him at Derby House as an easy-going commander, and an agreeable person to work with. Always conciliatory, Noble was an expert at building consensus around his chosen courses of action. Noble was, although not forced, certainly pushed out of Western Approaches to make room for Admiral Sir Max Horton, whose combative personality and experience in the submarine service made him the ideal candidate in the eyes of some to take the war to the U-boats.

He succeeded Admiral Sir Andrew Cunningham as Head of the British Naval Delegation to Washington DC in 1942, before retiring from active naval service in 1945. By way of recognition, Noble was granted the title of Rear-Admiral of the United Kingdom (an honorary appointment) on 19 June 1945.

Family
Noble married, in 1907, Diamantina Isabella, only daughter of Allan Campbell. She died in 1909, having one son (qv. Sir Allan Noble MP). He married secondly, in 1913, Celia Emily (later Lady Noble), daughter of Robert Kirkman Hodgson DL and Lady Norah née Boyle, having another son, Charles Noble.

A memorial to Admiral Sir Percy Noble was placed in the north choir aisle of Liverpool Cathedral in 1957.

Honours and awards
  Knight Grand Cross of the Order of the British Empire 1944
  Knight Commander of the Order of the Bath 1936 (CB 1932)
  Commander of the Royal Victorian Order 1920 (MVO 1901)
  Commander, Legion of Merit (United States) 1946
  Grand Cross of the Royal Norwegian Order of St Olav 1948
  Grand Officer of the Legion of Honour (France) 1948
  Grand Cross of the Order of the Dannebrog (Denmark) 1948
  Rear-Admiral of the United Kingdom 1945
 Hon. LLDs from Liverpool and Belfast Universities

References

External links
 www.npg.org.uk
 Time Magazine
The Noble Family Papers held at Churchill Archives Centre

|-

|-

1880 births
1955 deaths
Military personnel of British India
British people in colonial India
Royal Navy personnel of World War I
Royal Navy admirals of World War II
Commanders of the Royal Victorian Order
Knights Commander of the Order of the Bath
Knights Grand Cross of the Order of the British Empire
Commanders of the Legion of Merit
Lords of the Admiralty
Grand Officiers of the Légion d'honneur
Grand Crosses of the Order of the Dannebrog
Royal Navy admirals